The Ruth Asawa San Francisco School of the Arts, is a public alternative high school in San Francisco, California, United States. It was established in 1982 and is part of the San Francisco Unified School District.

History 

For many years, Ruth Asawa, sculptor and passionate advocate for arts in education, as well as others had campaigned to start a public high school in San Francisco devoted to the arts, with the ultimate goal of such a school to be located in the arts corridor in the heart of San Francisco's Civic Center.

At its inception in 1982, School of the Arts was created as a part of J. Eugene McAteer High School, on its present site on Portola Drive. Ten years later, in 1992, the school - now a full-fledged public school separate from McAteer - was relocated to the former SFUSD Frederick Burke Elementary School at 700 Font Boulevard on the campus of San Francisco State University. Due to the dissolution of McAteer High School in 2002, SOTA was offered to return to the more appropriate, fully equipped high school site. The school community elected to make this move, with the understanding that the school would eventually be situated in the Civic Center.

In 2005 a new public high school, the Academy of Arts and Sciences, was started and given space on the McAteer campus. Although it shares the campus with the Ruth Asawa School of the Arts, it is a completely separate school. Now called The Academy - San Francisco @ McAteer, it admits students through the normal high school admissions process.

In 2010, School of the Arts was renamed the Ruth Asawa San Francisco School of the Arts in honor of Ruth Asawa. In 2011, the school was recognized as a "California Distinguished School" by the California Department of Education as one of the state's most "exemplary and inspiring" public schools, demonstrating significant gains in narrowing the achievement gap among its students.

Admissions process 
Ruth Asawa School of the Arts offers visual and performing art classes daily in addition to a rigorous college preparatory curriculum. Students audition for placement in one department only. Auditioning students are admitted based on audition results; no academic criteria are used.  

Arts departments include Architecture & Design, Band, Creative Writing, Dance - Ballet + Modern, Guitar, Media + Film Arts, Musical Theatre, Orchestra, Piano, Spoken Arts, Theater Technology (Stagecraft or Costume + Fashion Design), Theatre Arts, Visual Arts, Vocal Music, World Dance, and World Music.

Auditions are held in February for placement the following school year. About 200 students are accepted. Ruth Asawa School of the Arts application process is different from other SFUSD high schools. Applicants must apply to both the school site and the San Francisco Unified School District. .

Alumni 
 Aya Cash, actress
 Margaret Cho, comedian, actress, fashion designer, author, and singer-songwriter
 Natalie Cressman, musician
 Lena Hall, actress, singer and songwriter
 Peregrine Honig, artist, filmmaker
 Crystal Lee, beauty pageant title holder
 MK Nobilette, singer
 Sam Rockwell, actor
 Salvador Santana, instrumentalist
 Joe Talbot, filmmaker
 Jesse Thorn, radio show host
 Miranda Lee Richards, singer-songwriter
 Aisha Tyler, actress, comedian, director and talk show host

References

External links 
 

Public high schools in San Francisco
Art schools in San Francisco
San Francisco Unified School District schools
Alternative schools in California
Educational institutions established in 1982
1982 establishments in California
Educational institutions disestablished in 2002
Schools of the performing arts in the United States